The Treasure Act 1996 is a UK Act of Parliament, defining which objects are classified as treasure, legally obliging the finder to report their find.

Provisions
The Act is designed to deal with finds of treasure in England, Wales and Northern Ireland. It legally obliges finders of objects which constitute treasure (as defined in the Act) to report their find to their local coroner within 14 days. An inquest led by the coroner then determines whether the find constitutes treasure or not. If it is declared to be treasure then the finder must offer the item for sale to a museum at a price set by an independent board of antiquities experts known as the Treasure Valuation Committee. Only if a museum expresses no interest in the item, or is unable to purchase it, can the finder retain it.

For the purposes of the Act, 'Treasure' is defined as being:

All coins from the same find, if it consists of two or more coins, and as long as they are at least 300 years old when found. If they contain less than 10% gold or silver there must be at least 10 in the find for it to qualify.
Two or more prehistoric base metal objects in association with one another
Any individual (non-coin) find that is at least 300 years old and contains at least 10% gold or silver.
Associated finds: any object of any material found in the same place as (or which had previously been together with) another object which is deemed treasure.
Objects substantially made from gold or silver but are less than 300 years old, that have been deliberately hidden with the intention of recovery and whose owners or heirs are unknown.

The Treasure Act allows for a reward up to the market value of the treasure to be shared among the finder and the tenants and/or owner of the land on which the treasure was found. The amount of the reward and how it is divided among the claimants is determined by the Treasure Valuation Committee.

Successful cases involving the Treasure Act include that of the Ringlemere gold cup. Non-treasure finds are the remit of the Portable Antiquities Scheme.

UK legislation

Code of Practice (DCMS)

Scotland

The act does not apply in Scotland, where treasure finds are a matter of Scots Common Law.

See also
Hoxne Hoard
Staffordshire hoard
Vale of York hoard
Scheduled Ancient Monument
Treasure trove

External links
Treasure Summary at the Portable Antiquities Scheme site
 Comprehensive article on 20 years of Portable Antiquities Scheme and the impact of Treasure Act 1996 on cultural property issues in the UK and beyond

Archaeology of the United Kingdom
 Treasure Act
United Kingdom Acts of Parliament 1996